"The Gnome" is a song by the English rock band Pink Floyd. Written by Syd Barrett, it is the eighth song on their 1967 debut album, The Piper at the Gates of Dawn. The song takes place in a fictional gnome world from the perspective of a gnome named Grimble Grumble.

Background
The song tells the tale of a scarlet tunic wearing gnome named Grimble Grumble. The lyrics ostensibly "came off the top [of Barrett's] head". "The Gnome" was included on the B-side of the US Pink Floyd single "Flaming" (Tower 378), which was never released in the UK.

Personnel
Syd Barrett – acoustic guitar, 12-string acoustic guitar, lead vocals
Roger Waters – bass guitar, backing vocals
Richard Wright – celesta, vibraphone, backing vocals
Nick Mason – temple blocks, cymbal

References

Pink Floyd songs
1967 songs
Pop ballads
Psychedelic songs
Songs written by Syd Barrett
Psychedelic pop songs
Fictional gnomes